Andriy Volodymyrovych Tovt (born 12 March 1985) is a Ukrainian former professional football goalkeeper and current goalkeeping coach at Lyubomyr Stavyshche.

References

External links

Profile on Official Illychivets Website
Profile on Football Squads

1985 births
Living people
Footballers from Kyiv
Ukrainian footballers
Ukraine youth international footballers
Association football goalkeepers
FC Obolon-Brovar Kyiv players
FC Obolon-2 Kyiv players
FC Krasyliv players
FC Mariupol players
FC Zirka Kropyvnytskyi players
MFC Mykolaiv players
FC Avanhard Bziv players
Ukrainian Premier League players
Ukrainian First League players
Ukrainian Second League players
Ukrainian Amateur Football Championship players
Association football goalkeeping coaches